The Cordwainer Smith Rediscovery Award honors underread science fiction and fantasy authors, with the intention of drawing renewed attention to the winners. The award was created in 2001 by the Cordwainer Smith Foundation in memory of the science fiction author Cordwainer Smith and has been awarded at the Readercon science fiction convention since 2002.

Winners
Olaf Stapledon, 2001
R.A. Lafferty, 2002
Edgar Pangborn, 2003
Henry Kuttner and C.L. Moore, 2004
Leigh Brackett, 2005
William Hope Hodgson, 2006
Daniel F. Galouye, 2007
Stanley G. Weinbaum, 2008
A. Merritt, 2009
Mark Clifton, 2010
Katherine MacLean, 2011
Fredric Brown, 2012
Wyman Guin, 2013
Mildred Clingerman, 2014
Clark Ashton Smith, 2015
Judith Merril, 2016
Seabury Quinn, 2017
Frank M. Robinson, 2018
Carol Emshwiller, 2019
, 2020
D. G. Compton, 2021

References

American literary awards
S
Science fiction awards